Río Sereno, also known as Sereno, is a town and corregimiento in Renacimiento District, Chiriquí Province, Panama, close to the Costa Rica border. It is the seat of Renacimiento District. Its population as of 1990 was 2,595; its population as of 2000 was 3,289.

It is a rural dairy and agricultural region.  The town is surrounded by vegetation.

Seasons:
Dry (Summer): December - April
Wet (Winter): May - November

Elevation: 1000 meters (over 3200 feet)

Average temperature: 18 °C

Climate: tropical template

References

Corregimientos of Chiriquí Province
Costa Rica–Panama border crossings